In mathematics, vector multiplication may refer to one of several operations between two (or more) vectors. It may concern any of the following articles:
 Dot product – also known as the "scalar product", a binary operation that takes two vectors and returns a scalar quantity. The dot product of two vectors can be defined as the product of the magnitudes of the two vectors and the cosine of the angle between the two vectors. Alternatively, it is defined as the product of the projection of the first vector onto the second vector and the magnitude of the second vector. Thus,
A ⋅ B = |A| |B| cos θ  
 More generally, a bilinear product in an algebra over a field.
 Cross product – also known as the "vector product", a binary operation on two vectors that results in another vector. The cross product of two vectors in 3-space is defined as the vector perpendicular to the plane determined by the two vectors whose magnitude is the product of the magnitudes of the two vectors and the sine of the angle between the two vectors. So, if n̂ is the unit vector perpendicular to the plane determined by vectors A and B,
A × B = |A| |B| sin θ n̂
 More generally, a Lie bracket in a Lie algebra.
 Hadamard product – entrywise product of vectors, where .
 Outer product - where  with  results in a  matrix.
 Triple products – products involving three vectors.
 Multiple cross products – products involving more than three vectors.

See also
Scalar multiplication
Matrix multiplication
Vector addition

Operations on vectors
Multiplication